Balaka streptostachys is a critically endangered species of flowering plant in the family Arecaceae. It is found only in Fiji. It is distinct from the other Balaka species because of the twists in its rachilla.

The only known population of this palm is in a stand of approximately 50 trees, on the northern foothills of Mt. Sorolevu on Vanau Levu.

It was first described by D. Fuller & John Leslie Dowe in 1999.

References

streptostachys
Endemic flora of Fiji
Critically endangered plants
Taxa named by John Leslie Dowe